Sylhet International University (SIU) is a private university located at Shamimabad, Bagbari, Sylhet, Bangladesh. It was established under The Private University Act of 1992.  SIU is affiliated with University Grants Commission of Bangladesh. The first vice-chancellor was Sadruddin Ahmed Chowdhury. The current vice-chancellor is Md. Shahid Ullah Talukder.

List of vice-chancellors 

 Prof. Md. Shahid Ullah Talukder ( present )

Schools
 School of Engineering
 School of Law
 The School of Business & Social Science

Departments
Department of Business Administration

 Bachelor of Business Administration(BBA)
 Masters of Business Administration(MBA)

Department of English

 Bachelor of Arts in English
 Masters of Arts(Preliminary and Final) in English
 Masters of Arts in English Literature and Language Program

Department of Law

 Bachelor of Law(Honours)
 LLB.(Preliminary and Final)
 Masters of Law(LL.M)

Department of Computer Science and Engineering

 Bachelor of Science(B.Sc.(Engg.))
 Bachelor of Science(Evening program)(B.Sc.(Engg.))

Department of Computer Science and Information Technology

 Bachelor of Science(B.Sc.(Engg.))

Department of Electronics and Communication Engineering

 Bachelor of Science(B.Sc.(Engg.))
 Bachelor of Science(Evening program)(B.Sc.(Engg.))

Academics
The university commenced its first academic session in October 2001.

The university offers the following programs:
 Bachelor of Business Administration (BBA)
 Master of Business Administration (Executive and regular)
 Bachelor of Science in Computer Science & Engineering (CSE)
 Bachelor of Science in Computer Science & Engineering (Evening) (CSE)
 Bachelor of Science in Computer Science & Informatics (CSI)
 Bachelor of Science in Electronics & Communication Engineering (executive and undergraduate)
 Bachelor of Science in Electronics & Communication Engineering  (Evening) 
 Bachelor of Science in Electrical & Electronics Engineering (executive and undergraduate)
 Bachelor of Arts in English
 Bachelor of Laws (L.L.B Hons)
 Evening programs
 Bachelor of Laws (L.L.B pass course)

References

Private universities in Bangladesh
Universities and colleges in Sylhet District
2001 establishments in Bangladesh
Educational institutions established in 2001